Cherry Lake (also known as Lake Lloyd) is an artificial lake in the Stanislaus National Forest of Tuolumne County, California, U.S.A., about  east of the city of Sonora.

The East and West forks of Cherry Creek combine just a couple of miles before reaching the lake, while the North Fork joins the East Fork about 10 miles (16 km) earlier. All three forks begin in the Emigrant Wilderness and all of them flow roughly southwest. The East Fork's source is a couple of miles (~6 – 8 km) southwest of the Mono County line and flows into Huckleberry Lake several miles (~6 – 8 km) later. The East and North forks meet several miles (~6 – 8 km) downstream of the lake. There are no lakes on the West Fork. Eleanor Creek, which forms Lake Eleanor, flows into Cherry Creek several miles (~6 – 8 km) downstream from Cherry Valley Dam. Lake Eleanor is another Hetch Hetchy Project facility. Cherry Creek flows into the Tuolumne River several miles (~6 – 8 km) later.

Cherry Valley Campground
This campground offers sites on both reservation and first come, first served basis. They have food storage containers, picnic tables and fire rings, with grates for cooking.  Some sites offer beautiful lake vistas. The roads through the campground are paved. There are bathroom facilities but no showers. Running water is located every few campsites.

Cherry Valley Dam
It was built by San Francisco City and County and the Modesto Irrigation District and Turlock Irrigation District. It was completed in 1956. The lake stores water for the Hetch Hetchy Project, which supplies drinking water to the San Francisco Bay Area, Modesto and Turlock districts. Recreation available at the lake includes, boating, skiing, swimming and fishing. Human contact with the water is allowed because the water has to be filtered anyway. Water from the lake powers the Dion R. Holm Power Plant, a 165 MW hydroelectric facility.

See also
Hetch Hetchy Reservoir
List of dams and reservoirs in California
List of lakes in California
List of largest reservoirs of California

References

External links
San Francisco Public Utilities Commission

Reservoirs in Tuolumne County, California
Hetch Hetchy Project
Tuolumne River
Stanislaus National Forest
Reservoirs in Northern California